Benjelloun or Ben Jelloun is a common Moroccan Surname. It may refer to: 

 Abdelmajid Benjelloun (1919–1981), Moroccan novelist, journalist and ambassador.
 Abdelmajid Benjelloun (1944– ), Moroccan writer, poet and historian, specialist in the history of northern Morocco.
 Abdessalam Benjelloun, Moroccan footballer.
Hassan Benjelloun, Moroccan screenwriter, director and producer.
 Omar Benjelloun, Moroccan politician, leader of the Socialist Union of Popular Forces
 Othman Benjelloun, Moroccan businessman and billionaire.
 Tahar Ben Jelloun, Moroccan writer and poet.

See also 
 Lists of most common surnames

Surnames of Moroccan origin